Palaechorium or Palaichorion was a town of Acte, ancient Macedonia noted by Pliny the Elder. The name has also come down to us in the form Palaeorium. 

Its site is unlocated.

References

Cities in ancient Macedonia
Populated places in ancient Macedonia
Former populated places in Greece
Ancient Athos
Lost ancient cities and towns